Bob Bryan and Mike Bryan were the defending champions, and won in the final 6–3, 7–6(7–4), against Mariusz Fyrstenberg and Marcin Matkowski.

Seeds
All seeds receive a bye into the second round. 

  Bob Bryan /  Mike Bryan (champions)
  Nenad Zimonjić /  Daniel Nestor (second round)
  Paul Hanley /  Kevin Ullyett (second round)
  Jonas Björkman /  Max Mirnyi (semifinals)
  Simon Aspelin /  Julian Knowle (quarterfinals)
  Andrei Pavel /  Pavel Vízner (quarterfinals)
  Martin Damm /  Leander Paes (second round)
  Mark Knowles /  Jamie Murray (second round)

Draw

Finals

Top half

Bottom half

External links
Main Draw

Doubles